Tahmuresat (also Romanized as Ţahmūresāt and Ţahmūrsāt; also known as Tahmūsārd) is a village in Rudasht-e Sharqi Rural District, Bon Rud District, Isfahan County, Isfahan Province, Iran. At the 2006 census, its population was 312, in 90 families.

References 

Populated places in Isfahan County